Adventures in Radioland is a 1987 album by the John McLaughlin-headed group Mahavishnu, released by the Relativity label which represents McLauglin's interest in electronic technology. It features McLaughlin using the New England Digital Synclavier with NED's proprietary guitar interface.

The album was recorded at Psycho Recording Studios & Sampling in Milan initially by Craigh Milliner then finished by Max Costa and mixed by John McLaughlin and Max Costa. It was released on CD by the Polygram label in 1993.

Track listing

Personnel 
John McLaughlin – guitars
Danny Gottlieb – drums
Jonas Hellborg – bass guitar
Bill Evans – saxophones, keyboards (4)
Mitchel Forman – keyboards

References

Mahavishnu Orchestra albums
Wounded Bird Records albums
1987 albums
PolyGram albums
Relativity Records albums